The European Association for Japanese Studies (EAJS or ヨーロッパ日本研究協会　ヨーロッパにほんけんきゅうきょうかい) was established in 1973 by European scholars in order to facilitate academic exchange in the field of Japanese studies within Europe.

Since 1976, conferences have been organised almost every three years.

All the activities of EAJS are mainly supported by the Japan Foundation, the Toshiba International Foundation, as well as some private funds.

Sections

Each conference is divided into specialist sections with convenors for each one. For 2011 the ten sections were:
 Urban and Environmental Studies
 Language and Linguistics
 Literature
 Visual and Performing Arts
 Anthropology and Sociology
 Economics, Business and Political Economy
 History
 Religion and History of Ideas
 Politics and International Relations
 Translating and Teaching Japanese

Conferences
 2021, Ghent / Belgium (held online)
 2017, Lisbon / Portugal
 2014, Ljubljana / Slovenia
 2011, Tallinn / Estonia
 2008, Lecce / Italy
 2005, Vienna / Austria
 2003, Warsaw / Poland
 2000, Lahti / Finland
 1997, Budapest / Hungary
 1994, Copenhagen / Denmark
 1991, Berlin / Germany
 1988, Durham / UK
 1985, Paris / France
 1982, The Hague / Netherlands
 1979, Florence / Italy
 1976, Zurich / Switzerland
 1973, Oxford, London / UK (1st)

Current president
 2017-2020 Andrej BEKEŠ, University of Ljubljana

Past presidents
 2014-2017 Bjarke Frellesvig, University of Oxford
 2011-2014 Rein Raud, Helsinki University
 2008-2011 Harald Fuess, Heidelberg University
 2005–2008 Viktoria Eschbach-Szabo, Tübingen University
 2003–2005 Brian Powell, Oxford University
 2000–2003 Joseph Kyburz, CNRS Paris
 1997–2000 Peter Kornicki, Cambridge University
 1994–1997 Irmela Hijiya-Kirschnereit, Freie Universitaet Berlin
 1991–1994 Adriana Boscaro, Venice University
 1988–1991 Sepp Linhart, Vienna University
 1985–1988 Ian Nish, London School of Economics
 1982–1985 Olof Lidin, Copenhagen University
 1979–1982 Charles Dunn, SOAS London
 1976–1979 Joseph Kreiner, Bonn University
 1975–1976 Joseph Kreiner, Bonn University
 1973–1974 Patrick O'Neill, London University

Notes

External links
 EAJS official home page

Japanese studies